Anotosaura vanzolinia, also known commonly as Vanzolini's anotosaura, is a species of lizard in the family Gymnophthalmidae. The species is endemic to Brazil.

Etymology
The specific name, vanzolinia, is in honor of Brazilian herpetologist and composer Paulo Vanzolini.

Geographic range
A. vanzolinia is found in extreme eastern Brazil, in the Brazilian states of Bahia, Paraíba, and Pernambuco.

Diet
The diet of A. vanzolinia consists of ants, termites, and other arthropods of the edaphic microfauna. Some arthropods include members of Arachnida, Crustacea, Hexapoda, and Diploda.

Habitat
The preferred natural habitat of A. vanzolinia is sparse shrubby vegetation, dense shrubby vegetation, sparse arboreal vegetation, dense arboreal vegetation, sparse shrubby-arboreal vegetation, and dense shrubby-arboreal vegetation. It dwells within leaf litter around shrubs, leaf litter among bromeliads, leaf litter around rocky outcrops, and isolated leaf litter.

Reproduction
A. vanzolinia is oviparous. Clutch size is two eggs.

References

Further reading
Dixon JR (1974). "Systematic Review of the Lizard Genus Anotosaura (Teiidae)". Herpetologica 30 (1): 13–18. (Anotosaura collaris vanzolinia, new subspecies, p. 17).
Oliveira BHS, Queiroz RNM, Cavalcanti LBQ, Mesquita D (2018). "Autoecology of neotropical lizard species Anotosaura vanzolinia (Squamata, Gymnophthalmidae) in a Caatinga region, north-eastern Brazil". Herpetological Journal 28 (1): 19–26.
Vanzolini PE (1976). "Two notes on Anotosaura (Sauria, Teiidae)". Papéis Avulsos de Zoologia, Museu de Zoologia da Universidade de São Paulo 30 (8): 119–122. (Anotosaura vanzolinia, new status).

Anotosaura
Reptiles of Brazil
Endemic fauna of Brazil
Reptiles described in 1974
Taxa named by James R. Dixon